Boris Becker was the two-time defending champion but lost in the third round to Jay Berger.

Miloslav Mečíř won in the final 3–6, 2–6, 6–1, 6–2, 6–3 against Yannick Noah.

Seeds
The top eight seeds received a bye into the second round.

Draw

Finals

Top half

Section 1

Section 2

Bottom half

Section 3

Section 4

References
 1989 Newsweek Champions Cup Draw - Men's Final

Newsweek Champions Cup - Singles